Beth Milstein is an American television writer and producer.

Positions held
The Young and the Restless (hired by Josh Griffith)
Script Writer: May 14, 2008 – July 10, 2008; November 19, 2012 – September 24, 2015
Script Editor: July 11, 2008 – November 2, 2012; November 10, 2017 – Present

Days of Our Lives
Interim Head Writer: August 10, 2006 - October 4, 2006
Co-Head Writer: January 31, 1992 - June 12, 1992, February 22, 2016 – September 2, 2016
Associate Head Writer: 1987 - 1992, October 5, 2006 - October 26, 2007
Associate Producer: 1981 - 1987

The Bold and the Beautiful (hired by Bradley Bell)
Script Writer: August 23, 2002 - May 23, 2005

Port Charles
Associate Head Writer: 2000

Sunset Beach
Script Writer: 1997 - 1998

Awards and nominations
2 Writers Guild of America Awards

2010 season, The Young and the Restless 

2013 Season, The Young and the Restless 
Nomination, 1997 season, Sunset Beach
Nomination, 1991 season, Days of our Lives

3 Emmy Awards

HW History

|-

External links
 

American soap opera writers
American women television writers
Soap opera producers
Year of birth missing (living people)
Place of birth missing (living people)
Living people
Women soap opera writers
American women television producers
21st-century American women writers